Scorpion Soup is a limited edition collection of stories by the travel writer and novelist Tahir Shah. The book was released on June 8, 2013 by Secretum Mundi Publishing.

Overview
The collection is unusual in that all 18 stories link into one another, starting with a first person story about a fisherman, and returning to that same character. Inspired by the Arabian Nights, Shah experiments with interwoven layers, allowing one tale to flow into the next in a technique known as the Frame story. As occurs in the Arabian Nights, there is often no ending to one story before the next begins. The book has been inspired and is an homage to his grandfather, Ikbal Ali Shah.

The stories of Scorpion Soup
The Fisherman
Idyll
Capilongo
Mittle-Mittle
The Tale of the Rusty Nail
The Shop That Sold Truth
Frogland
The Book of Pure Thoughts
The Fish’s Dream
Scorpion Soup
The Clockmaker’s Bride
The Most Foolish of Man
The Man Whose Arms Grew Branches
The Hermit
Cat, Mouse
The Singing Serpents
The Princess of Zilzilam

Illustrations
Scorpion Soup is illustrated with fold out maps from the Atlas Maior by the great seventeenth century Dutch cartographer Joan Blaeu.

Reviews
 Stories within stories: A review of Tahir Shah’s ‘Scorpion Soup’ in The Toronto Review of Books.
 Review: Scorpion Soup in Bookfabulous blog. 
 Book Review in Mystical Faction blog. 
 Like a Moth to a Flame in The Uncustomary book review.
 An Intriguing Story within a Story in What Nikki reads.

References

Books by Tahir Shah
2010 short stories